Based on the Japanese Wikipedia article

The Daihatsu J-series engine is a series of the inline-four engines specially for Daihatsu's kei cars that was produced from August 1994 to August 2012. This was the first and last inline-four engine for Daihatsu's kei cars, debuted in the L502 Daihatsu Mira that was launched in September 1994.

It features smooth engine rotation, low noise, less vibration and quite powerful power in its class (turbo version). But since the stroke is short and volume per cylinder is small (164.75 cc) compared to the inline-three engine (±220 cc, which is common for kei cars), the torque characteristics and fuel consumption in the lower rpm is not that great compared to inline-three engine. For this reason, it can be said that the engine is more specialized for sport driving rather than "stop and go city driving".

On 31 August 2012, as the production of the first Daihatsu Copen ended, the production of the J-series engine ended as well. Daihatsu has announced that it will integrate the engine for kei cars into inline-three in the future (EF engine).

Design
The specification is water-cooled inline-four cylinder DOHC 16-valve EFI, the bore and stroke size is 61.0 mm x 56.4 mm, which made 659 cc of displacement. The camshaft was driven by a timing chain, which is very rare for a kei car at that time.

Based on the turbocharged JB-JL engine, the JC-DET engine that powered the M112S Daihatsu Storia X4 had its displacement increased to 713 cc by lengthening the stroke to 61.0 mm, making it a square engine (61.0 mm x 61.0 mm). Combined with the "turbo factor" multiplier of 1.4, this engine was perfectly suited for Japan's sub-1 liter rally class.

A "2" as a third digit of the car's model number (xx2) usually indicates that it is powered with J-series engine (excepting the Daihatsu Copen), for example: L502 Daihatsu Mira or L902 Daihatsu Move.

Specifications:

JB-EL
659 cc inline-four DOHC 16-valve water-cooled EFI, the bore and stroke size is 61.0 mm x 56.4 mm. Naturally aspirated, the compression ratio is 10.0.

Application:
L502 Daihatsu Mira

JB-JL
659 cc inline-four DOHC 16-valve water-cooled EFI, the bore and stroke size is 61.0 mm x 56.4 mm. Turbo with intercooler, compression ratio 8.7.

Applications:
L502/512S Daihatsu Mira
L602S Daihatsu Move

JB-DET
659 cc inline-four DOHC 16-valve water-cooled EFI, the bore and stroke size is 61.0 mm x 56.4 mm. Turbo with intercooler, the compression ratio is 8.2.

Applications:
L152S Daihatsu Move
L802S Daihatsu Opti
L902/912S Daihatsu Move
L952/962S Daihatsu Max

JB-DET (twin-scroll)
659 cc inline-four DOHC 16-valve water-cooled EFI, the bore and stroke size is 61.0 mm x 56.4 mm. Twin-scroll turbo with intercooler, the compression ratio is 8.2.

Application:
L800K Daihatsu Copen

JC-DET
713 cc inline-four DOHC 16-valve water-cooled EFI, the bore and stroke size is 61.0 mm x 61.0 mm. Turbo with intercooler, compression ratio 8.0.

Applications:
M112S Daihatsu Storia X4

See also
List of Daihatsu engines

References 

J